Parisian Inc. was an American chain of department stores founded and headquartered in Birmingham, Alabama. Competing mainly in the established Southeastern US market through the 1980s against Nordstrom, Neiman Marcus, and Gus Mayer, Parisian underwent a series of restructurings and mergers during its 130-year history, and was taken over by Proffitt’s, Inc. in 1996. In September 2006, Belk purchased the Parisian department store properties from Saks for $285 million, although that sale did not include the Parisian nameplate. Five Parisian store locations in Michigan, Indiana, and Ohio were instead sold to Bon-Ton, and closed nine additional stores nationwide. The remaining twenty-four locations were rebranded as Belk in September 2007, except for the three Michigan stores, which continued to operate as Parisian until rebranding as Carson's in 2013, later to close in 2018.

History

Early history
Parisian was founded in Birmingham, Alabama in 1877 by Estella and Bertha Sommers. The sisters sold it to Carl Hess and William Holiner in the 1920s. Hess's son Emil and Holiner's son-in-law, Leonard Salit, bought the chain in 1950 and established its first credit program. After Salit died, Hess's family took over the chain.

Parisian opened stores in several shopping malls throughout Birmingham in the 1970s, including Eastwood Mall (now Eastwood Village). In the 1960s, it began opening stores outside Birmingham.  First they opened a store in Gateway Shopping Center in Decatur, Alabama and then expanded to Parkway City Mall in Huntsville, University Mall in Tuscaloosa, Bel Air Mall in Mobile, and Eastdale Mall and Montgomery Mall in Montgomery. By the mid-1980s, Parisian had 13 stores in Alabama. Its first two stores outside the state were both in Florida at Cordova Mall in Pensacola, and Sarasota Square Mall (now Westfield Sarasota Square) in Sarasota. Australian-based real estate firm LJ Hooker bought Parisian, Bonwit Teller, and B. Altman in 1988, but sold its share in Parisian a year later after LJ Hooker filed for bankruptcy. The company sold Parisian back to the Hess family. By the early 1990s, Parisian had opened its first stores outside the Southeastern United States: in Michigan, Indiana, and Ohio. In the mid 1990s, two new stores opened in Florida alone were at Seminole Towne Center and The Avenues.

Acquisition by Proffitt's in 1996
In 1996, Proffitt's Inc. bought 38-store Parisian for $200 million and assumed Parisian's $250 million debt. Proffitt's, which had acquired Younkers and McRae's two years before, also acquired G.R. Herberger's in 1996. In 1997, Proffitt's included five brands: 19 Proffitt's stores, mostly in Tennessee; 29 McRae's stores in Alabama and Mississippi; 48 Younkers stores, mostly in Iowa, Wisconsin and Michigan; 40 Parisian stores; and 39 Herberger's stores, concentrated in the Midwest.

Proffitt's continued to make acquisitions, buying the Carson Pirie Scott chain of 52 stores in the Midwest in 1997 and Brody's in North Carolina in 1998. Proffitt's bought Saks Fifth Avenue for $2.1 billion in 1998, which included 100 Saks stores and 40 discount Off 5th outlet stores, and changed its own name from Proffitt's, Inc. to Saks Incorporated.

At its height, Saks Incorporated operated more than 250 medium to high-end department stores under its Saks Fifth Avenue Enterprises group, the Parisian division, the Northern Department Store Group (Younkers, Herberger's, Carson Pirie Scott, Bergner's, Boston Store), and its Southern Department Store Group (Proffitt's and McRae's) — plus more than 50 Club Libby Lu specialty shops.

Sale of Parisian department store locations and properties to Belk in 2006 and conversion

Belk, Inc., a privately held department store chain based in Charlotte, North Carolina purchased the Proffitt's and McRae's stores from Saks on March 8, 2006, and immediately converted them to the Belk nameplate. On August 2, 2006, Belk announced the $285 million purchase of Parisian from Saks. That transaction included 38 Parisian department stores, a  administrative/headquarters facility in Birmingham, Alabama, and a  distribution center in Steele, Alabama.

On February 2, 2007, the company further announced plans to change its share of Parisian stores over to the Belk nameplate by September 12, 2007. With the Parisian transaction complete, Belk operates 315 stores in 19 states.

Belk quickly resold five Parisian store locations in Michigan, Indiana and Ohio to Bon-Ton Stores, and closed a handful of additional stores nationwide. The remaining Parisian locations were rebranded as Belk in September 2007, except for the three Michigan stores, which continued to operate as Parisian until 2013.

Sale of five Parisian store locations to Bon-Ton in 2006
On October 25, 2006 Belk announced the $22 million sale of four Parisian stores and rights for the construction of a fifth store to The Bon-Ton Stores, Inc. The store locations included:

 Livonia, Michigan – Laurel Park Place – .
 Rochester Hills, Michigan – The Village of Rochester Hills – .
 Beavercreek, Ohio – The Mall at Fairfield Commons – . – became an Elder-Beerman. Store was abandoned by Elder-Beerman in 2014, and the structure will be torn down in 2015 to make room for new restaurant construction.
 Indianapolis, Indiana – Circle Centre – . – former site of the L. S. Ayres flagship store – first of four former Parisian locations to rebrand as Carson Pirie Scott. Store closed in Spring 2018.
 Clinton Township, Michigan – The Mall at Partridge Creek – . (opened October 18, 2007; first new location under new ownership, rebranded at Carson's in 2013 and closing June 2018)

The sale closed on October 31, 2006.

The two Bon-Ton-owned Parisian stores in Michigan operating prior to October 2007 — Laurel Park Place in Livonia, and The Village of Rochester Hills in Rochester Hills — continued the Parisian nameplate. The Clinton Township store, which opened October 18, 2007, also operated as a Parisian location. All three Detroit stores were rebranded as Carson's in January 2013, when Bon-Ton's license from Belk to use the Parisian name expired, making the end of this former Alabamian  upscale chain .

References

Further reading
, Merchandising "Saks Incorporated Annual Report (Parisian) ". SEC Filing, April 10, 2006.
 ""The Look" Parisian Fall 2006 Catalog". Parisian., September 2006.

External links
Parisian official site (archived)
Saks Incorporated corporate website
Belk official website
https://www.definitions.net/definition/PARISIAN#:~:text=Belk%20quickly%20resold,Parisian%20until%202013.

Companies based in Birmingham, Alabama
Defunct department stores based in Alabama
Retail companies established in 1877
Retail companies disestablished in 2013
Defunct companies based in Alabama
1998 mergers and acquisitions
1877 establishments in Alabama